Phacellophyllum caespitosum is an extinct species of tabulate coral.

References

Rugosa
Late Devonian animals
Fossil taxa described in 1966